Laccobius borealis is a species of water scavenger beetle in the family Hydrophilidae. It is found in Central America and North America.

References

Further reading

 

Hydrophilinae
Articles created by Qbugbot
Beetles described in 1971